Línea Aérea Conviasa (legally Consorcio Venezolano de Industrias Aeronáuticas y Servicios Aéreos) is a Venezuelan airline with its headquarters on the grounds of Simón Bolívar International Airport in Maiquetía, Venezuela, near Caracas. It is the flag carrier and largest airline of Venezuela, operating services to domestic destinations and to destinations in the Caribbean and South America. Conviasa is known to make routes from a political perspective rather than a financial standpoint.

History

Early years

In January 1997, Venezuela's former flag carrier, Viasa, ceased operations after 37 years of service due to prolonged financial problems. In May 2001, the idea to create a new flag carrier for Venezuela was proposed, but in December 2002, the project was put on hold until October 1, 2003. On March 31, 2004, then President of Venezuela, Hugo Chávez, signed a decree that formally established the airline. This decree was published in the nation's official gazette the next day.

On November 28, 2004, Conviasa's inaugural flight was made with a De Havilland Canada Dash 7 flying from the airport in Charallave to the Santiago Mariño International Airport, on Margarita Island. On December 10, 2004, Conviasa formally began its national and international operations. Conviasa was originally run by the now defunct Ministry of Production and Commerce, but it has since been taken over by the Ministry of Infrastructure.

On April 17, 2006, José David Cabello replaced Wilmer Castro Sotelo as head of Conviasa. On June 30, 2006, Jose David Cabello replaced Ramon Alonzo Carrizalez Rengifo as the Minister of Infrastructure and on July 18, 2006, Franklin Fernandez Martinez became president of Conviasa.

Development since 2010

Following the crash of Flight 2350 on September 17, 2010, the government of Venezuela grounded all Conviasa flights so that it could perform a technical review of the airline's fleet. The airline said that the temporary suspension would remain in effect until October 1, 2010. Flights were then re-instated.

Decree No. 7838 of the Official Gazette No. 39,558 published on Wednesday, provides for the appointment of Colonel citizen (AVB) Jesús Rafael Viñas García, President of the Venezuelan Consortium Trading Company Aircraft Industries and Air Services SA (CONVIASA) under the Ministry of Popular Power for Transportation and Communications.

On April 3, 2012, Conviasa was banned from flying to countries in the European Union because of safety concerns. It said that Conviasa failed to show it had taken adequate steps to prevent future accidents, but had this restriction lifted on July 10, 2013.

On September 2012, Conviasa took delivery of their first Embraer E190. 20 Were ordered, but only received 15 Embraer 190s, and one Embraer Lineage 1000. 

Conviasa is under the authority of the Ministry of Aquatic and Air Transport. The airline is owned by the Venezuelan government (80%) and the regional government of Nueva Esparta (20%). Conviasa has its headquarters on the grounds of Simón Bolívar International Airport in Maiquetía, Venezuela, near Caracas. Originally Conviasa had its headquarters on Margarita Island. At one time Conviasa had its headquarters in the East Tower of Parque Central in Caracas.

In August 2016, it has been reported that over 80 percent of Conviasa pilots quit their jobs due to low and outstanding payments and the airline had to reduce operations down to around 16 flights per day subsequently. Additionally, several of the company's aircraft have been stored unused since several months.

On May 5, 2017, Conviasa was forced to suspend all international operations due to a lack of foreign currency to pay for international aircraft insurance. Also in May 2017, Wamos Air terminated its contract with Conviasa on short notice. Wamos Air operated a single Boeing 747-400 for Conviasa between Caracas and Madrid. In autumn 2019, Conviasa started again many early terminated international routes back for its network.

On February 7, 2020 the United States Office of Foreign Assets Control ("OFAC") added Conviasa and its fleet of 40 aircraft to the Specially Designated Nationals list.  In practice this makes it extremely unlikely that Conviasa will be able to source replacement parts for its fleet of airworthy and grounded B737 aircraft.  Additionally, US Nationals are prohibited from flying on Conviasa's domestic and international flights.  Finally, to the extent that other countries abide by OFAC policy, those countries (Brazil, France, UK) will refuse to sell Conviasa replacement parts for Embraer and Airbus aircraft, prohibit its nationals from flying Conviasa, and will cancel Conviasa-serviced routes to their respective countries (Panama, Mexico, Bolivia, and Ecuador).

In July 2020, Conviasa bought a 23-year old Airbus A340-300 to supplement its single A340-200, as well as to reinforce air cargo and long radius. In March and June 2022, Conviasa received two 20-year old Airbus A340-600s as part of the company’s fleet expansion, also announcing that the company will receive a A340-500 in the following months. Conviasa however, retired their last commercial A340-200 in October 2022. This means Conviasa will be the only commercial operator that operated all models of the Airbus A340.

Destinations
, Conviasa serves the following scheduled destinations:

Codeshare agreements
Conviasa has codeshares agreements with the following airlines:
Iraqi Airways (planned)
Syrian Air

Fleet

Current fleet

, the Conviasa fleet includes the following aircraft:

Former fleet
Conviasa had in the past operated the following aircraft:

Accidents and incidents
On December 16, 2005, Conviasa Flight 2600, a De Havilland Canada Dash 7 (registered YV-1003) with 36 passengers and 4 crew members on board, was forced to make a belly landing at Porlamar's airport when the landing gear failed to deploy. After circling Porlamar for an hour and a half to burn off fuel, the aircraft touched down without any injuries.

On August 30, 2008, a Boeing 737-200 (registered YV102T), took off from Caracas, and was bound to Latacunga, Ecuador, 80 kilometers (50 miles) south of Quito. Three crew members (a captain, a first officer and a mechanic) were on board. The aircraft crashed in the mountainous area in Ecuador's Andes, killing all the three crew on board.

On September 13, 2010, Conviasa Flight 2350, an ATR 42-300 (registered YV1010) with 47 passengers and 4 crew on board, crashed shortly before landing. It was a domestic scheduled passenger flight from Porlamar, Isla Margarita to Ciudad Guayana. There were 34 survivors and 17 fatalities.

On August 13, 2012, Conviasa Flight 2197, an ATR 72-200 (registered YV2421), made a high-speed aborted takeoff resulting in a runway excursion close to a ravine. All 67 occupants on board sustained minor injuries, while the aircraft sustain minor damage.

See also
List of airlines of Venezuela

References

External links

Official website
 Part one of the decree that created Conviasa
 Part two of the decree that created Conviasa

Airlines of Venezuela
Airlines established in 2004
Airlines formerly banned in the European Union
Government-owned airlines
Vargas (state)
Venezuelan brands
Venezuelan companies established in 2004